Dumitru Hubert (born September 3, 1899, death August 27, 1934 in Braşov) is a Romanian bobsledder and aviator who competed in the 1930s. He won two medals in the two-man event at the FIBT World Championships with a gold in 1933 and a bronze in 1934.

At the 1932 Winter Olympics in Lake Placid, New York, Hubert finished fourth in the two-man event and sixth in the four-man event.

References
Bobsleigh two-man world championship medalists since 1931
Wallechinsky, David (1984). "Bobsled". In The Complete Book of the Olympics: 1896-1980. New York: Penguin Books. pp. 558, 560.

1899 births
1934 deaths
Romanian male bobsledders
Olympic bobsledders of Romania
Bobsledders at the 1932 Winter Olympics